Mosolovka is a rural locality (a selo) and the administrative center of Mosolovskoye Rural Settlement, Anninsky District, Voronezh Oblast, Russia. The population was 375 as of 2010. There are 7 streets.

Geography 
Mosolovka is located 10 km north of Anna (the district's administrative centre) by road. Pervomayskoye is the nearest rural locality.

References 

Rural localities in Anninsky District